Mardonius is a genus of giant African millipedes in family Spirostreptidae, containing nine species:
 Mardonius aculeatus Attems, 1914
 Mardonius brasilianus Attems, 1950
 Mardonius cerasopus Attems, 1914
 Mardonius interruptus (Brölemann, 1902)
 Mardonius legationis Attems 1950
 Mardonius nakitawa (Silvestri, 1907)
 Mardonius parvus Demange & Mauriès, 1975
 Mardonius rusticus Attems, 1950
 Mardonius sculpturatus Attems, 1914

References

Spirostreptida
Millipedes of Africa